The Dark Mail Alliance is an organization dedicated to creating an email protocol and architecture with end-to-end encryption.

In October 2013, Silent Circle and Lavabit announced a project to create a more secure alternative to email and began a fundraising effort. The Dark Mail Alliance team consists of Phil Zimmermann, Jon Callas, Mike Janke, and Ladar Levison.

DIME 
Dark Internet Mail Environment (DIME) aims to be a secure communication platform for asynchronous messaging across the Internet. It was presented by Ladar Levison and Stephen Watt at DEF CON on August 8, 2014.

Specifications 
There have been multiple revisions for DIME specifications. The latest revision is presented as a preliminary draft.
 First public revision, December 2014
 Preliminary draft, March 2015

Protocols 
 Dark Mail Transfer Protocol (DMTP)
 Dark Mail Access Protocol (DMAP)

Data formats 
 Signet Data Format
 Message Data Format (D/MIME)

Implementations

Server-side 
Magma is the reference MIME server implementation. It supports server side encryption, Simple Mail Transfer Protocol (SMTP), Post Office Protocol (POP), Internet Message Access Protocol (IMAP) and Hypertext Transfer Protocol (HTTP).

Client-side 
Volcano, a Thunderbird fork with DIME support.

See also 
 Email encryption
 Email privacy
 Kolab Now
 Pretty Good Privacy
 pretty Easy privacy

References

External links
 Dark Mail Alliance web site

Email
Privacy of telecommunications
Internet privacy organizations
Computer security organizations
2013 establishments